Zoran Šaraba (born September 26, 1971) is a Bosnian Serb football coach and a former player.

Career
Born in Trebinje, SR Bosnia and Herzegovina, Šaraba played with FK Vojvodina, FK Budućnost Valjevo, Panelefsiniakos F.C., AO Kavala, Carl Zeiss Jena, SV Kapfenberg and RFK Novi Sad.

References

1971 births
Living people
People from Trebinje
Serbs of Bosnia and Herzegovina
Serbian footballers
Serbian football managers
Association football defenders
FK Vojvodina players
FK Budućnost Valjevo players
First League of Serbia and Montenegro players
Kavala F.C. players
FC Carl Zeiss Jena players
RFK Novi Sad 1921 players
Kapfenberger SV players
Yugoslav First League players
Panelefsiniakos F.C. players
Serbian expatriate footballers
Expatriate footballers in Greece
Expatriate footballers in Germany
Expatriate footballers in Austria
Serbian expatriate sportspeople in Greece
Serbian expatriate sportspeople in Germany
Serbian expatriate sportspeople in Austria